White people in Zambia or White Zambians are people from Zambia who are of European descent and who do not regard themselves, or are not regarded as, being part of another racial group.

Background
The first Europeans to discover Zambia were the Portuguese in the late 1700s.

In 1966, two years after Zambian independence, 70,000 people of European origin lived in the country, with 18% of the White community living in the capital Lusaka. Half of the White population lived in the Copperbelt region to the north near the border with the Congo's Katanga Province.

In the 1960s, White Zambians tended to favour white-minority rule in Rhodesia and the apartheid system in South Africa, although small numbers prevented them from establishing a similar form of government in Zambia. At the Copperbelt mines, 6,500 expatriate workers held South African citizenship. White Zambians made up the second-largest group of immigrants moving to South Africa by 1967, fearful of the changing political climate in Zambia. The migration of White Zambians to South Africa did not stop until the late 1970s, by which point there were only about 10,000 Whites left in Zambia who held Zambian citizenship. 

The Black African-led government of Zambia pursued a policy that allowed White residents of the country, as they were not automatically granted citizenship by birth, to register as Zambian citizens within two years of independence. However, this did not guarantee that citizenship would be awarded. President Kenneth Kaunda criticised continued racial discrimination in the Copperbelt area in a speech delivered in October 1966. Following the speech, 23 Whites were deported for inspiring "racial and industrial unrest".

Between 1964 and 1972, white Zambians were disproportionately represented in the officer corps of the Zambian Defence Force. Upon independence, most of the senior officer corps, including the chief of staff of the Zambian Army, were White Zambians. By 1972, sufficient numbers of qualified black Zambian personnel had been trained to replace them, and many of the white senior officers retired. For a number of years afterwards, white Zambians were explicitly barred from enlisting in the national military and received a blanket exemption from conscription.

Modern day
In 2014, Zambia had a White population of European origin which numbered approximately 40,000. Since independence, the community has never exceeded 1.1% of Zambia's population. Many long-term residents had voluntarily retained South African or British nationality. However, only about 40,000 hold Zambian citizenship. Guy Scott, a White Zambian citizen and former Vice President, became Acting President of Zambia after the unexpected death of President Michael Sata.

Population chart

See also
White Angolans
White Zimbabweans
History of the Jews in Zambia

References

Further reading

Ethnic groups in Zambia
History of Zambia
 
Zambia